Yasin Sulaiman (born October 30, 1975) is a male singer from Malaysia. Born to a Malay father and Australian mum, this third child out of seven siblings started his art career through the a nasyid genre group named "Brothers" since 1995.

Soon after he launch his solo career in "World Music". His evergreen legendary hit "Mimpi Laila", has succeeded in promoting his name as a singer and composer when he won the overall title at the Anugerah Juara Lagu in 2001.

His second solo album titled Salsabila won the Best Ethnic Pop Album award at the 10th Anugerah Industri Muzik in 2003. He now focuses on his career as a publisher and songwriter. Among his popular compositions are "Wassini, "Lagu Rindu", "Ku Temu Cahaya" and "Alhamdulillah".

Career
Brothers (1995–present)
Yasin was one of the earliest members of the Malaysian nasheed group Brothers during its inception in 1995 and produced two albums with the group - We Are... (1997) and Satu Perjuangan (1998). Yasin left the Brothers in 2000 to pursue his solo career and was replaced by Akbar Azmi. Yasin rejoined the group in 2005 through the Brothers Reunited album. In 2015, this group emerged with the latest album, Sabar which is the fourth album of Yasin with Brothers and the last one of the members of this group, Salleh Deril before his death in October of a heart attack, leaving Yasin and two remaining members.

Solo career (2001-present)
Yasin started his solo career in 2001 and then appeared with the album Mimpi Laila who risked his first single with the same title. This is followed by his second solo album, Salsabila (2004) and Qudus Flow'' (2007) and singles such as "Aisha" and "Because of Him".

In August 2016, he appeared with his latest single "Music" which got a touch of guitar by his close friend, singer Faizal Tahir. The song is available on all digital platforms such as Spotify, iTunes, KKBox, Deezer, Raku, Joox and Apple Music from August 5, 2016.

Filmography

Film

Television series

References

External links
 

Living people
1975 births
People from Kuala Lumpur
20th-century Malaysian male singers
Malay-language singers
Malaysian male singer-songwriters
Malaysian singer-songwriters
21st-century Malaysian male singers
Malaysian Muslims
Malaysian people of Malay descent
Malaysian people of Australian descent